Shadow of the Law may refer to:
 Shadow of the law, a legal term
 Shadow of the Law (1930 film), an American pre-Code film
 Shadow of the Law (1926 film), an American silent crime drama